Ümit Sonkol (born July 24, 1982) is a Turkish former professional basketball player for. He played the power forward position.

Personal life 
He has mechanical engineering degrees after finishing Balıkesir University, Faculty of Engineering and Architecture.

External links 
 TBLStat.net Profile

References 

1982 births
Living people
Aliağa Petkim basketball players
Balıkesir University alumni
Bandırma B.İ.K. players
Bornova Belediye players
İstanbul Teknik Üniversitesi B.K. players
Karşıyaka basketball players
Merkezefendi Belediyesi Denizli Basket players
Mersin Büyükşehir Belediyesi S.K. players
Petkim Spor players
Power forwards (basketball)
Tofaş S.K. players
Turkish men's basketball players
Turkish mechanical engineers
Türk Telekom B.K. players